Shadow of Angels is a 1976 Swiss drama film directed by Daniel Schmid. It was entered into the 1976 Cannes Film Festival. The film is based upon the play Der Müll, die Stadt und der Tod by Rainer Werner Fassbinder.

Cast
 Ingrid Caven - Lily Brest
 Rainer Werner Fassbinder - Raoul
 Klaus Löwitsch - Jude / Broker
 Annemarie Düringer - Luise Müller
 Adrian Hoven - Herr Müller, ihr Mann
 Boy Gobert - Chief of Police: Müller II
 Ulli Lommel - Der kleine Prinz / Little Prince
 Jean-Claude Dreyfus - Zwerg / Dwarf (as Jean-Claude Dreyfuss)
 Irm Hermann - Emma
 Alexander Allerson - Hans von Gluck
 Harry Baer - Helfritz

References

External links

1976 films
1976 drama films
1970s German-language films
Films directed by Daniel Schmid
Films produced by Michael Fengler
Films set in Frankfurt
Swiss films based on plays
Films à clef
Swiss drama films
Films based on works by Rainer Werner Fassbinder